Birkdale railway station serves the Birkdale suburb of Southport, England. The station is located on the Southport branch of the Merseyrail network's Northern Line.

History
The first Birkdale station opened on the then new, single track Liverpool, Crosby and Southport Railway. This station was located at " Gilbert's Crossing", over half a mile nearer Liverpool than the present station. The line was subsequently developed rapidly, being doubled and completed through to Liverpool. In 1851 this station was replaced by a wholly new, two platform station called "Birkdale Park" which formed the basis of the present day station. By 1910 it had been renamed plain "Birkdale". Both the later station and the original station building at what had evolved to be mapped as "Gilbert's Crossing" can be seen on the Edwardian OS 6" map. The old station building was not demolished until 1965. By 2012 Gilbert's Crossing was obliterated by housing. It was just south of the junction of Dunkirk and Dover roads.

The line became part of the Lancashire and Yorkshire Railway (LYR), on 14 June 1855. who took over from the (LCSR). The Lancashire and Yorkshire Railway amalgamated with the London and North Western Railway on 1 January 1922 and in turn was Grouped into the London, Midland and Scottish Railway in 1923. Nationalisation followed in 1948 and in 1978 the station became part of the Merseyrail network's Northern Line (operated by British Rail until privatisation in 1995).

The signal box adjacent to the station, built in 1905, is a Grade II listed building.

Facilities
The station is staffed, during all opening hours, and has platform CCTV. There is a booking office and live departure and arrival screens, for passenger information. There is car parking for 90 cars, secure cycle storage for 24 cycles and cycle racks for a further 26 cycles. A subway links both platforms but both platforms can be accessed without steps via the level crossing.

Services
Trains operate every 20 minutes throughout the day from Monday to Saturday and on summer Sundays to Southport to the north, and to Hunts Cross via Liverpool Central to the south. Winter Sunday services are every 30 minutes in each direction.

References

Bibliography

External links

Railway stations in the Metropolitan Borough of Sefton
DfT Category E stations
Former Lancashire and Yorkshire Railway stations
Railway stations in Great Britain opened in 1848
Railway stations served by Merseyrail
Buildings and structures in Southport